INS Sarayu was a  of the Indian Navy.

Sarayu was sold to the Sri Lanka Navy, where she was named as SLNS Sayura. She serves as the flagship of the Sri Lanka Navy and obtained several remarkable naval victories against the naval branch of Tamil Tiger rebels (Sea Tigers). She was recently equipped with Yingi Y-82 anti-ship missiles and surface to air missiles.

References

Sukanya-class patrol vessels
Patrol vessels of the Indian Navy
1989 ships